A Service Design Sprint is a time-constrained Service Design project that uses Design Thinking and Service Design tools to create a new service or improve an existing one. The term Service Design Sprint was first mentioned by Tenny Pinheiro in his book The Service Startup: Design Thinking Gets Lean (Elsevier; 2014).

Methodology 
The Minimum Valuable Service methodology used in a Service Design Sprint  combines Agile-based approaches with Service-dominant logic and Service Design tools  to help product development teams understand, co-design, and prototype complex service scenarios with low resources and within the timespan of a week. The methodology, created by Tenny Pinheiro in 2014, was designed to be used by startups in their Agile sprints.

Applications 
A Service Design Sprint differs from a traditional Design Sprint due to its service dominant logic inclination. Since its inception, the approach has being used by startup accelerators, educational institutions like the university of Lapland in Finland, MIT, and fortune 500 companies in many different sectors.

Structure 
The Minimum Valuable Service model  is divided into four phases each containing a set of tools.
 Projection: Agile ethnographic tools are used to uncover untapped barriers, needs, and desires, understand mental models and get a sense of the user's “Learn, Use and Remember” journey.
 Perspectives: Tools like the Swap Ideation are used here to co-design with users, generating valuable service propositions.
 Playground: Mockup and roleplaying tools are used to prototype ideas and explore concepts in a playful manner. 
 Polish Off: The MVS Journey, an Agile service blueprint tool, is used in this phase to breakdown interactions in intentions and avatars.

References 

Design
Software development process
Agile software development